Skjellerup, or the Anglicised version Skellerup, may refer to:

Blake Skjellerup (born 1985), New Zealand speed skater
Frank Skjellerup (1875–1952), Australian astronomer
George Skellerup (1881–1955), New Zealand industrialist
Peter Skellerup (1918–2006), New Zealand industrialist and local-body politician
Valdemar Skellerup (1907–1982), New Zealand industrialist

See also
Skellerup (disambiguation)